Eslettes is a commune in the Seine-Maritime department in the Normandy region in northern France.

Geography
The A151 autoroute pass through the territory of the commune.

Toponymy
Mentioned in a Latinized version : Esletis ab. 1040. Old Norse sletta "flat land" with an Old English plural -s. Same origin as Sleights (Yorkshire), and without -s, Sletten (Denmark).

Population

Places of interest
 The modern church of Sainte-Jeanne-d'Arc (Joan of Arc), dating from the twentieth century. Built between 1920 (canonization year of Joan of Arc) and 1925.
 Two châteaux, de la Ratière and Galais.
 The eighteenth-century château des Alleurs.

See also
Communes of the Seine-Maritime department

References

Communes of Seine-Maritime